Dan Reiter (born 29 September 1967, Ann Arbor, Michigan) is an American political scientist. He is currently the Samuel Candler Dobbs Professor at the Department of Political Science at Emory University.

Education
Reiter received his B.A. with honors in political science from Northwestern University in 1989 and his Ph.D in political science from the University of Michigan in 1994. He was a John M. Olin postdoctoral fellow in national security at Harvard University from 1994 to 1995.

Academic career
Reiter has had a number of articles published in leading peer-reviewed journals, including the American Political Science Review and World Politics. His book, How Wars End, was the recipient of a 2010 Best Book Award from the American Political Science Association.

Bibliography
Crucible of Beliefs: Learning, Alliances and World Wars (Cornell University Press, 1996)
Democracies at War (Princeton University Press, 2002)
Preventive War and Its Alternatives: The Lessons of History (Strategic Studies Institute, U.S., Army War College, 2006)
How Wars End (Princeton University Press, 2009)

Notes

External links
 Dan Reiter's website
 Dan Reiter at the Emory University Department of Political Science

Living people
American political scientists
People from Ann Arbor, Michigan
University of Michigan alumni
Northwestern University alumni
Place of birth missing (living people)
1967 births
Emory University faculty
American people of German descent